Maya Thirrai is a 2017 Indian Tamil-language streaming television series that premiered on 30 April 2017 and 13 August 2017 on ALTBalaji. The series is available for streaming on the ALT Balaji App and its associated websites since its release date.

Plot
The series revolves around Prakash and Sandhya. Sandhya has everything that ever girl desires but something felt missing. After years of waiting, she meets Prakash, a handsome widower who came with a promise of all she ever wanted. Little did she know that her picture-perfect marriage was nothing but an illusion. The series explores a mysterious grandmother, an autistic twin, a seductress, and a chilling supernatural vibe that makes a thrilling story.

Cast
 Nandha Durairaj as Prakash
 Eden Kuriakose as Sandhya
 Lakshmi Priyaa Chandramouli as Priya
 Sanjana Singh as Thaara

Episodes
 
 Episode 1: Mistaken identity
 Episode 2: I am in Love
 Episode 3: Please Marry Me
 Episode 4: Someone's Watching
 Episode 5: Twin Terror
 Episode 6: Am I Safe Here?
 Episode 7: Please Believe Me
 Episode 8: Enough Is Enough
 Episode 9: Who is Thaara? 
 Episode 10: Sudden Death
 Episode 11: Next Target
 Episode 12: Run for Life
 Episode 13: Killer... Revealed
 Episode 14: Love at first sight
 Episode 15: How Priya Died
 Episode 16: Season Finale: Not the End

References

External links
 Watch Maya Thirrai on ALT Balaji website
 

ALTBalaji original programming
Tamil-language web series
2017 Tamil-language television series debuts
Tamil-language thriller television series
2017 Tamil-language television series endings